Laurentius Metsius (c.1520–1580) was the second bishop of 's-Hertogenbosch, in the Habsburg Netherlands. As ex officio abbot of the Abbey of Tongerlo he sat in the First Estate of the States of Brabant during the early years of the Dutch Revolt.

Life
Metsius was born in Oudenaarde around 1520 and studied at the University of Leuven, graduating Licentiate of Sacred Theology. In 1557 he was appointed to a canonry of the collegiate church of St Gudula, in Brussels, becoming dean in 1563. Philip II of Spain named Metsius to the see of 's-Hertogenbosch on 16 November 1569, and Pope Pius V confirmed the nomination on 13 March 1570. Metsius received episcopal consecration at the hands of Maximilian de Berghes, Archbishop of Cambrai, in St Gudula's on 23 April 1570. He made his entry into his see on 8 May 1570.

On 8–10 May 1571, Metsius presided at the first diocesan synod of 's-Hertogenbosch, the statutes of which were published as Statuta primæ synodi diœcesanæ Buscoducensis. In 1572 he issued a Manual for the diocese, Manuale Pastorum sive formula aut ritus administrandi sacramenta pro diœcesi Buscoducensi.

As a member of the States of Brabant, Metsius was a signatory to the 1577 Union of Brussels, but his loyalty to the traditional order made him suspect to the rebels. In October 1577 he fled 's-Hertogenbosch, finding refuge first in Cleves and later in Namur. In 1579 he served as vicar general of the diocese of Namur, while the see was vacant, himself consecrating the new bishop, François de Wallon-Cappelle, in 1580. He died in Namur the same year and was buried in the church of St Aubin.

References

1592 deaths
Belgian bishops
16th-century Roman Catholic bishops in the Holy Roman Empire
Old University of Leuven alumni
Year of birth uncertain